GGICO is a rapid transit station on the Red Line of the Dubai Metro in Dubai, UAE.

The station is commonly known as Garhoud Station and opened on 15 May 2010.

The station is named for GGICO (Gulf General Investment Company), a Dubai Financial Market listed public shareholding company established in 1973. Beyond this station, the metro line goes underground.

Platform layout

References

Railway stations in the United Arab Emirates opened in 2010
Dubai Metro stations